Thari may refer to:

 something of, from, or related to Tharparkar, a region of Sindh, Pakistan
 Thari language, spoken in Sindh, Pakistan
 Tharri, a town in Larkana District, Sindh, Pakistan
 Thari Mirwah, or Thari, a town in Khairpur District, Sindh, Pakistan
 Thari (TV series), a 2019 Tamil-language TV series
 Thari people, an ethnic group in Pakistan

See also 
 Thari Pheko, Botswanan civil servant
 Tari (disambiguation)
 Thuri (disambiguation)